Amir Mahyar Tafreshipour (born 1974) is an Iranian-Danish composer. His first opera The Doll behind the Curtain, based on a short story by Sadeq Hedayat (1903–1951), was premiered in London in 2015. A recording was made when performed at the Royal Danish Opera in 2020. by the Athelas Sinfonietta, conducted by Eirik Haukaas Ødegaard.

References

1974 births
Living people
21st-century Danish composers
21st-century classical composers
Danish classical composers
Danish male classical composers
21st-century Danish male musicians
Danish opera composers
Male opera composers